Matthew Louis Pence (born April 13, 1972) is an American recording engineer, producer, and drummer. He owns and manages The Echo Lab studio in Denton, Texas.

Early life and education
Pence is from St. Louis, Missouri.

In 1990, Pence moved to Denton, Texas to study jazz at University of North Texas College of Music.

Career
In 1996, Pence did his first recording for a drummer friend on their record. 

In 1999, musician and mastering engineer Dave Willingham created The Echo Lab studio outside the woods in Denton, Texas. In 2006, Pence and musician / engineer Matthew Barnhart became co-owners with Willingham of his Echo Lab studio. Pence is currently the full owner of The Echo Lab.

International bands from Australia, Britain, and other places, like Sweard from Spain and Horse Company from Holland, have all recorded at The Echo Lab.

From 1997 until 2014, Pence played drums in the alternative country band Centro-matic. He was also the drummer in the Centro-matic-fueled band, South San Gabriel.

Pence has also had a long-time collaboration with musician Sarah Jaffe, co-producing her 2011 record, The Way Sound Leaves a Room and her 2017 record, Bad Baby, as well as touring with Jaffe as her drummer.

In 2004, Pence mixed American Music Club's album called Love Songs For Patriots. He also recorded the song "Song Of The Rats Leaving The Sinking Ship".

Pence produced the forthcoming 2020 record by John Moreland, called LP5, which will feature contributions from Centro-matic's Will Johnson, as well as Bonnie Whitmore and Moreland's long-time bandmate, John Calvin Abney.

In addition to his work as a drummer, producer, and engineer, Pence is a photographer.

Honors
 2011: Dallas Observer Music Awards, Producer of the Year (nominee)
 2017: Dallas Observer Music Awards, Best Drummer

General discography

Drummer
 Adam's Farm
 Camerado
 Centro-matic
 Dan C
 Dooms U.K.
 Green Hour Residency
 Jason Isbell
 Jay Farrar
 Jonathan Tyler
 Justin Townes Earle
 Marie/Lepanto
 Nikki Lane
 Paul Cauthen
 Sarah Jaffe
 South San Gabriel

Production

 Breastfist
 Fishboy
 Here We Go Magic
 Isaac Hoskins
 Jonathan Tyler
 Rossif Sutherland
 Telegraph Canyon
 The Breeders
 True Widow
 Yuck

Selected discography
 2001: Midlake, Milkmaid Grand Army EP (self-released) – recorded by, mixed by
 2001: Jay Farrar, Sebastopol (Artemis Records) – drums, percussion
 2002: Lewis, Even So (Deep Elm Records) – engineer
 2004: Aqueduct, Pistols at Dawn EP (Sub Pop Records) – producer, drums
 2004: American Music Club, Love Songs For Patriots (Merge Records/Devil in the Woods/Cooking Vinyl) – mixer
 2004: Brave Combo, Let's Kiss: 25th Anniversary Album (Dentone Records) – engineer
 2006: The Drams, Jubilee Dive (New West Records) – producer, photography
 2006: Glossary, For What I Don’t Become (Undertow Music) – producer
 2007: Robert Gomez, Brand New Towns (Bella Union) – producer
 2009: Midlake, Acts of Man CD single (Bella Union) – mixed by
 2009: Midlake, The Courage of Others EP (Bella Union) – mixed by
 2009: Jason Isbell, Jason Isbell and The 400 Unit (Lightning Rod Records) – producer
 2009: Jason Molina and Will Johnson, Molina and Johnson (Secretly Canadian) – recording engineer, drums
 2009: Monsters of Folk (Conor Oberst, Jim James, Mike Mogis, M. Ward), Monsters of Folk (Shangri-La Music, Rough Trade Records) – mixer
 2010: Glossary, Feral Fire (Liberty & Lament) – producer
 2010: The Foxymorons, Bible Stories (self-released) – producer
 2010: Micah P. Hinson, Micah P. Hinson And The "Pioneer Saboteurs" (Houston Party Records) – co-producer, mixed by, mastered by, backgrounds
 2010: John Grant, Queen of Denmark (Bella Union) – mastering, mixing
 2011: Sarah Jaffe, The Way Sound Leaves a Room (Kirtland Records) – engineer, co-producer
 2011: True Widow, As High As the Highest Heavens and From the Center to the Circumference of the Earth (Kemado Records) – producer
 2012: Dodgy, Stand Upright in a Cool Place (Strike Back Records) – mixing
 2012: Jens Lekman, I Know What Love Isn't (Service/Secretly Canadian) – mixing
 2012: Jay Farrar, Will Johnson, Anders Parker, and Yim Yames: New Multitudes (Rounder Records) – mixing
 2013: True Widow, Circumambulation (Relapse Records) – producer
 2013: Cody Jinks, Blacksheep EP (Late August Records) – drums
 2013: Sean Nelson, Make Good Choices (Really Records) – drums
 2014: Justin Townes Earle, Single Mothers (Vagrant Records, Loose Music) – drums
 2014: The Bigsbys, Good Will Suitcase (Shiner Records) – producer
 2014: Collin Herring, Some Knives (self-released) – producer
 2015: Becca Stevens, Perfect Animal (Universal Music Classics) – mixed by
 2015: The Foxymorons, Fake Yoga (Foxyphoton) – producer
 2015: Denim Wonder (aka Daniel Hopkins, Carnation (self-released) – producer
 2015: Justin Townes Earle, Absent Fathers (Vagrant Records, Loose Music) – drums
 2015: Redeye, The Memory Layers (Lafolie Records/Microcultures) – producer
 2016: Rodney Parker, Bomber Heights (self-released) – producer
 2016: Midlake, The Trials Of Van Occupanther single (Bella Union) – "The Fairest Way" / "Festival" mixed by, mastered by
 2017: Nikki Lane, Highway Queen (New West Records) – drums, engineer, percussion, producer
 2017: BNQT, Volume 1 (Dualtone Records) – mixed by, mastered by
 2017: Lift to Experience, The Texas-Jerusalem Crossroads (Bella Union) – engineer, mixing
 2017: Sarah Jaffe, Bad Baby (Kirtland Records) – producer
 2017: Tomkat, Icarus (self-released) – producer
 2018: Josh T. Pearson, The Straight Hits! (Mute) – engineer
 2018: Claire Morales, All That Wanting (self-released) – engineer
 2018: Maps & Atlases, Lightlessness Is Nothing New (Barsuk Records) – mastering
 2018: Elle King, Shake the Spirit (RCA Records) – co-producer
 2018: John Grant, Love Is Magic (Bella Union) – drum programming, engineering, additional production by
 2018: Paul Cauthen, Have Mercy EP (Lightning Rod Records) – engineer
 2019: Paul Cauthen, Room 41 (Lightning Rod Records) – mixed by
 2019: E.B. the Younger, To Each His Own (Bella Union) – engineer, mixing, executive producer, drums, percussion
 2020: John Moreland, LP5 (Thirty Tigers) – producer

Centro-matic and associated projects
 1995: Centro-matic, Redo the Stacks (Steve Records) – co-producer with Will Johnson, drums
 1999: Centro-matic, Navigational (Idol Records) – co-producer with Will Johnson, drums
 1999: Centro-matic, The Static vs. The Strings Vol. 1 (Idol/Quality Park) – drums
 2000: Centro-matic, All the Falsest Hearts Can Try (Idol/Quality Park/Munich) – drums
 2000: South San Gabriel, South San Gabriel Songs/Music (Idol/Munich) – drums
 2001: Centro-matic, Distance and Clime (Idol/Munich) – drums
 2002: South San Gabriel, Welcome, Convalescence (Munich/Undertow Music) – drums, keyboards
 2002: Will Johnson, Murder of Tides (Undertow Music) – producer
 2003: Centro-matic, Love You Just The Same (Misra Records/Munich) – drums, engineer
 2005: South San Gabriel, The Carlton Chronicles: Not Until the Operation's Through (Misra/Munich/Houston Party) – drums
 2006: Centro-matic, Fort Recovery (album) (Misra Records) – drums
 2008: Centro-matic/South San Gabriel, Dual Hawks (Misra/Cooking Vinyl/Houston Party) – drums
 2011: Centro-matic, Candidate Waltz (Undertow Music) – drums
 2012: Will Johnson, Scorpion (Undertow Music) – producer
 2014: Centro-Matic, Take Pride in Your Long Odds (Navigational Transmissions) – engineer, producer

See also
 Centro-matic
 South San Gabriel

References

Further reading

External links

 
 Matt Pence at The Echo Lab
 
 Matt Pence at Undertow Music

Living people
1972 births
American country record producers
American male drummers
Musicians from St. Louis
American audio engineers
People from St. Louis
People from Denton County, Texas
Musicians from Texas